Tony Martinez may refer to:

 Tony Martínez (1940–1991), Cuban-born Major League Baseball shortstop
 Tony Martinez (broadcaster), American television and radio broadcaster
 Tony Martinez (actor) (1920–2002), Puerto Rican actor, singer, and bandleader